Bence Svasznek (born July 25, 1975) is a Hungarian former professional ice hockey player.

Svasznek represented Hungary in the 2009 IIHF World Championship.

Career statistics

Austrian Hockey League

References

External links

1975 births
Fehérvár AV19 players
DVTK Jegesmedvék players
Ferencvárosi TC (ice hockey) players
HC Nové Zámky players
Hungarian ice hockey defencemen
Living people
Ice hockey people from Budapest
Újpesti TE (ice hockey) players
Hungarian expatriate sportspeople in Slovakia
Hungarian expatriate ice hockey people
Expatriate ice hockey players in Slovakia